Flatrock Creek is a  tributary of the Auglaize River in northeastern Indiana and northwestern Ohio in the United States. It drains a primarily rural farming area in the watershed of Lake Erie.

The creek flows northwest from Ohio into eastern Allen County, Indiana, then turns northeast at Monroeville, Indiana and flows into Paulding County, Ohio, past Payne and Paulding.

See also
List of rivers of Indiana
List of rivers of Ohio

References

Rivers of Indiana
Rivers of Ohio
Rivers of Paulding County, Ohio
Rivers of Allen County, Indiana
Tributaries of Lake Erie